Dawazisaurus is an extinct genus of sauropterygian of possible nothosauroid affinities from the Middle Triassic Guanling Formation in China. The type species is D. brevis.

References 

Nothosaurs